The Council of the City of Kuching South (abbreviated MBKS) is the city council which administers the southern part of the city of Kuching in the state of Sarawak, Malaysia. This council was established after the city was officially granted city status on 1 August 1988. Their jurisdiction covers an area of 61.53 square kilometres.

The council consists of the mayor plus thirty councillors appointed to serve a one-year term by the Sarawak State Government. DBKU is responsible for public health and sanitation, waste removal and management, town planning, environmental protection and building control, social and economic development and general maintenance functions of urban infrastructure Majlis Perbandaran Kuching (MPK).

History
During the days of the Brooke Administration, some semblances of the functions of the Council were performed by the Public Works Department. Sir Charles Vyner Brooke was installed as the Third Rajah on 22 July 1918. In 1921 the Kuching Sanitary and Municipal Advisory Board was formed. Following a new legislation, the Board became the Municipal Authority for Kuching on 1 January 1934 marking the early beginning of what would in due course become the local authority for Kuching, known as the Kuching Municipal Board.

At the outbreak of hostilities in 1941, the Central Government was giving consideration to the question of according full municipal status to the Board, but the war interrupted this and the question was not considered again until the resumption of Civil Government in 1946, at which time Sarawak had also become a colony of Great Britain.

In 1947, it was found necessary to introduce a modified form of Committee System as the work of the Board had grown to such as extent as to make it impracticable for the Municipal Commissioners to deal with the various problems of administration in a single monthly meeting.

In 1949, the Governor of Sarawak directed that the Chairman of the Kuching Municipal Board should submit a comprehensive detailed scheme to convert the Municipality into a local government entity, financially self-supporting and managing its own affairs, subject to such safeguards as might be deemed advisable. As a result of this action the Municipality became autonomous on 1 January 1953.

The municipal council at this time was formed on a purely racial basis of twenty-four representatives of the public, with a British officer as chairman. The governor in council appointed the chairman, as he also did six other councillors of various nationalities who represented different interests in the lives of the local community. The other eighteen councillors with approval of the governor were nominated by the various associations, who looked after the interest of the Chinese, Malay, Indian, Ceylonese, Dayak and British communities.

In 1956, initiatives were made by the governor to plan for the first free election, which eventually took place on 4 November. A total of 58 persons offered themselves as candidates for the 9 wards and 278 seats on the new Council. The newly elected Council took office on 1 December 1956. The President and Vice President were elected from among the Councillors and held office for a period of one year, with eligibility for re-election. Free election lasted only for several years.

The 3-year term of office of the 1963 elected Councillors should have expired on 30 June 1966. However, due to certain political development in the State, the tenure of office was extended by the State Government and the Councillors who were elected at the 3rd local council elections in 1963 continued to hold office until 14 October 1981 when the Council was restructured. The enactment of the Kuching Municipal (Amendment) (No.2) Ordinances 1977 made 15 December 1977 among other things, led the elective system by an appointment system of Councillors. It was provided that the Council should consist of the Chairman, the Deputy Chairman; and not less than eight and not more than twenty-four Councillors to be appointed by the Governor to serve a term not extending three years. This amendment Ordinance was only brought into force with effect from 15 October 1981 on which date a new set of Councillors were appointed and all the Councillors elected in 1963 ceased to hold office on 14 October 1981.

On 1 August 1988, the Municipality was elevated to city status, making it the fourth city in Malaysia after George Town, Kuala Lumpur and Ipoh. This historic date also saw the administrative division of the City into Kuching North (covering a significant part of the central areas of downtown Kuching, previously administered by the Kuching Municipal Council and including new areas across the Sarawak River, previously administered by the Kuching Rural District Council) and Kuching South (covering part of the areas previously administered by the Kuching Municipal Council to the east of downtown Kuching and come new areas to the south of the former Municipality, previously administered by the Kuching Rural District Council) comprising an area of 61.53 km2.

The Council of the City of Kuching South is a corporation established under the Local Authorities Ordinance, 1996. Like all other local authorities, it is essentially an authority providing public services within its area of jurisdiction comprising an area of 61.53 km2.

The Council now consists of a Mayor, a Deputy Mayor and 30 Councillors, all of whom are appointed by the State Government of Sarawak. The State Government appoints the Councillors on a 2-year term, renewable at its discretion. The Councillors represent the various political component parties of the coalition government of Sarawak. The Councillors are responsible for formulating the Councils policies and for ensuring that the Administrator implements these policies in an efficient and effective manner.

The mode by which the Council conducts its business is through the committee system. The Standing Committees normally meet once a month to deal with matters under their respective terms of reference. The Committees make decisions in the form of recommendations to the Full Council for its adoption at its ordinary meeting, which is usually held at the end of the month. The City Secretary is the Chief Administrative Officer of the City Council. Its various divisions, namely the Administration, the Treasury, the Building & Landscaping, the Engineering, the Rating and Valuation, the Public Health, and the Licensing undertake the functions of the Organisation. Each head of division controls expenditure as approved in the annual estimates of the Council. The mode by which the Council conducts its business is through the committee system. The Standing Committees normally meet once a month to deal with matters under their respective terms of reference. The Committees make decisions in the form of recommendations to the Full Council for its adoption at its ordinary meeting, which is usually held at the end of the month.

Appointed mayors of Kuching South

List of Councillors

 (15)
 (8)
 (3)
 (3)
 (1)

See also
 Kuching North City Hall (DBKU)
 Padawan Municipal Council (MPP)

External links

Kuching
Local government in Sarawak
City councils in Malaysia